Syrian–Palestinian relations refers to the official relations between Syria and Palestine. Palestine has an embassy in Damascus, but Syria has no official representative office in Palestine.

History
The two countries share a strong historical bond, as both were together used to be under Phoenicians, and later subjected by various occupations and wars, spanned from the Persian Empire, Roman Empire, Arabs, Crusaders and the Ottoman Empire. However, in 20th century, Syria and Palestine would be later carved and divided between France and the British Empire, and this would remain until the end of World War II.

Modern relations
Syria soon announced its complete support to Palestine after the 1948 Arab–Israeli War broke out, and had sent troops to fight against newly-formed Israel Defense Forces, but it failed to change the tie, and later also failed to get a peace talk. Since then, with the influx of Palestinian refugees to Syria, relationship between Syria and Palestine became very complex, while mainly brotherly, also share significant differences.

Syria also joined the Six-Day War hoping to expel the Israeli Army in order to restore Palestinian state, but failed. This war radically changed Syrian and Palestinian society. For Syrians, the failure damaged their reputation, and subsequently created further mistrust.

Hafez al-Assad was known for his hostility towards Yasser Arafat and Faisal Husseini, with attempts to divide the Palestinian leadership.

Syrian Civil War
The Syrian Civil War created divisions among Palestinians over the Assad regime in Syria. Hamas leaders endorsed the 2011 civil uprisings in Syria and left their Syrian headquarters in Damascus in 2012.

Some Palestinians have accused Assad of enabling torture and murder of Palestinians, and recently, the demolition of Palestinian refugee camps in Syria, notably in Yarmouk. Assad was further accused of allowing rape and torture of Palestinians.

Palestinians in Syria
There were over more than 500.000 Palestinians in Syria, mostly refugees, before the outbreak of Syrian Civil War.

See also
Palestinians in Syria 
Syria Palaestina
Embassy of the State of Palestine in Syria

References

 
Palestine
Syria